The 1922 Earlham Quakers football team represented Earlham College during the 1922 college football season.

Schedule

References

Earlham
Earlham Quakers football seasons
Earlham Quakers football